Unplugged Café Tacuba is a complete live album (ninth overall) that was recorded in 1995 and released in 2005 as a CD/ DVD combo by Mexican alternative rock group Café Tacvba. Café Tacuba was the first Mexican rock band to ever appear on MTV Unplugged twice. The live performance was recorded in 1995 and released on CD and DVD in 5.1 surround sound on June 7, 2005. The MTV Unplugged album includes the selections "El Metro," "La Ingrata," "Esa Noche," "Una Manana," "Bar Tacuba," and others.

Track listing

Unplugged Café Tacuba DVD

A DVD which included several interviews of guests and others involved in the show was also released.

External links
MTV Unplugged Café Tacvba on Amazon
MTV Unplugged de Café Tacvba on Apple Music

2005 live albums
Latin American music
Live Rock en Español albums
Albums produced by Gustavo Santaolalla
Café Tacuba live albums